The Women in Military Service for America Memorial silver dollar is a commemorative dollar issued by the United States Mint in 1994.  It was one of three coins in the 1994 Veterans Program, along with the Vietnam War Memorial and Prisoners of War silver dollar.

Specifications
The following specifications are given by H.R. 3616.
 Weight: 
 Diameter: 
 Composition: 90% Silver, 10% Copper

See also
 United States commemorative coins
 List of United States commemorative coins and medals (1990s)

References

1994 establishments in the United States
Modern United States commemorative coins
Monuments and memorials to women
Women in the military
History of women in the United States